Robin Cathy Herman (November 24, 1951 – February 1, 2022) was an American writer and journalist. She was the first female sports journalist for The New York Times.

Herman had a successful and eclectic career, ranging from sports writing to assistant dean of communications for Harvard school of Public Health, where she also taught. She also wrote about health and medicine for The Washington Post and about women's issues on Twitter and in a personal blog, and she published a book on renewable energy.

Early life and education 
Herman was born in New York City on November 24, 1951. She grew up in Port Washington, Long Island, New York. She was among the first class of women enrolled in Princeton University in 1969. Herman graduated with a bachelor's degree in English in 1973, a member of the first graduating class of women in Princeton history. During her time at Princeton, she was the only female staffer of The Daily Princetonian. She was initially assigned to news, but after confronting the sports editor, she covered men's rugby. She later became their first female sports editor, then a managing editor.

Career 
Herman became the first female sportswriter in the history of The New York Times upon graduation in 1973.

1975 NHL All-Star Game 

Herman and Marcelle St. Cyr (CKLM radio in Montreal) became the first female reporters allowed in a men's professional sports locker room on January 21, 1975, at the 1975 NHL All-Star Game in Montreal, Canada. While the Wales Conference all-star team easily beat the Campbell Conference all-star team 7–1, television cameras and other journalists instead focused on Herman's and St. Cyr's presence in the locker room, despite Herman's efforts to turn the attention back to the game.

Other journalism 
Herman, the only female member of the Professional Hockey Writers Association during her sports writing career, gained access to all but four NHL team locker rooms over four years. She moved to New York political coverage for The Times for five years, until she left the paper in 1983. In 1991, she wrote for The Washington Post and covered issues relating to health and medical fields.

Harvard 
In 1999, Herman was appointed as director of Harvard T.H. Chan School of Public Health's office of communications. In 2006, she became the assistant dean of communications and remained in the position for four years. She additionally co-taught a health communications course at the school.

Art 
After 13 years at Harvard, Herman established a career in fine arts, painting in watercolor, acrylic and pastel.

Political views 
Aside from writing for the Times as a political writer for five years, Herman wrote about women's issues, including in sports, on Twitter (@girlinthelocker) and in a blog on a personal website. She started the blog in response to George W. Bush's bid for re-election in 2004. She said: "I felt that women's rights and integrity were being undermined by the Bush administration and that younger women did not realize that their standing in society was being eroded." She felt her experience as a female sports journalist and the "girl in the locker room" well represented the cause for equal opportunity in employment and other rights for women.

Personal life 
Herman was married to Paul Horvitz with whom she had a daughter and a son. She died of ovarian cancer at her home in Waltham, Massachusetts on February 1, 2022, at the age of 70.

Published works 
She wrote Fusion: The Search for Endless Energy, a history of science book published by Cambridge University Press in 1990.

Awards and recognition 
Herman won the Mary Garber Pioneer award, the highest honor of the Association of Women in Sports Media given in recognition of "distinguished work in the sports media industry and commitment to upholding and advancing the values of AWSM".

She is mentioned in the 2013 documentary Let Them Wear Towels. The documentary details the struggles of those women who first sought to enter the male locker rooms in various professional sports leagues. It is part of the series of documentaries produced by ESPN Films entitled Nine for IX. The series focuses on women in sports and is told through the lens of female film makers.

References 

1951 births
2022 deaths
Deaths from ovarian cancer
Deaths from cancer in Massachusetts
People from Port Washington, New York
Princeton University alumni
The New York Times people
American sports journalists
Journalists from New York City
American women sportswriters
Sportswriters from New York (state)
20th-century American journalists
20th-century American women writers